Solanilla is a locality located in the municipality of Sabiñánigo, in Huesca province, Aragon, Spain. As of 2020, it has a population of 17.

Geography 
Solanilla is located 61km north-northeast of Huesca.

References

Populated places in the Province of Huesca